Tofiqi (also, Tofiki and Toyfiki) is a village and municipality in the Agdash Rayon of Azerbaijan.  It has a population of 1,278.

References 

Populated places in Agdash District